A commercial pilot licence (CPL) is a type of pilot licence that permits the holder to act as a pilot of an aircraft and be paid for their work. 

Different licenses are issued for the major aircraft categories: airplanes, airships, balloons, gliders, gyroplanes and helicopters. Depending on the jurisdiction these may all be on the same document.

A CPL will typically have no expiry date. However, a valid medical certificate and valid rating will be required to use it. A pilot's ratings may be listed on the licence, including the types of aircraft that can be flown (single-engine or multiengine), whether flight under instrument flight rules is allowed (instrument rating), and whether instructing and examining of trainee pilots can be done (instructor or examiner rating).

Requirements

The basic requirements to obtain the license and the privileges it confers are agreed internationally by the International Civil Aviation Organization (ICAO). However the actual implementation varies quite widely from country to country. According to ICAO, to be eligible for a commercial pilot license, the applicant must;
 be able to read, speak, write, and understand English
 already hold a private pilot license
 have received training in the areas of a commercial pilot
 successfully complete the relevant written exams.

The JAA has several approved courses leading to the issue of a JAA commercial pilot's license with an instrument rating without first obtaining a private pilot's license. Upon completing those prerequisites the applicant will then receive an exam from the governing aviation body that consists of an oral and practical flight test from an examiner. Applicants for a CPL (aeroplanes) must also have completed a solo cross-country flight of at least 300 nm with full-stop landings at two airfields other than the pilot's airfield of origin.

In the United Kingdom, a pilot must have flown 200 hours for the issue of a CPL, including 100 hours as pilot in command. They must have completed a qualifying cross country flight of at least 300 nautical miles as pilot in command, including full stop landings at two aerodromes different from the departure aerodrome.

In Canada, a pilot must be at least 18 years old, and must hold a Category 1 Medical Certificate.  They must complete at least 80 hours of classroom instruction on a variety of topics, and pass a written exam with a score of at least 60%.  They must also have logged at least 200 hours of flying experience. The experience must include 100 hours as the pilot in command, as well as specific experience at night, flying cross-country, and instrument time.

See also
 Airline Transport Pilot Licence
 Commercial aviation
 Pilot licensing and certification
 Pilot licensing in Canada
 Pilot licensing in the United Kingdom
 Pilot certification in the United States

References

Aviation licenses and certifications
Flight training